"Junat ja naiset" is a Finnish-language song by Finnish pop singer Jenni Vartiainen. It was released in Finland as the lead single from her third studio album Terra on 16 August 2013 by Warner Music Finland.

Chart performance
"Junat ja naiset" debuted at number 15 on the Finnish Singles Chart on the week 41 of 2013.

Charts

References

External links
 

2013 songs
Jenni Vartiainen songs
Finnish-language songs
Warner Music Finland singles